Viktor Klutho was an American architect of German descent, who designed a number of Catholic churches, schools, convents and rectories in Missouri, Illinois, and Indiana, and elsewhere.

Personal life
Born in Alsace-Lorraine, Klutho came to St. Louis with his family at age 12. His long career began in 1885 as a carpenter; by 1887, he had formed a partnership with Frederick Boeke known as Klutho and Boeke. In 1900, he began an independent practice of architecture and was licensed to practice architecture in Illinois by 1902.

Works include
 Benedictine Hall, Shawnee, Oklahoma
 St. Francis De Sales Church, St. Louis Missouri (1908)
 The Chapel of the Monastery of the Immaculate Conception, Ferdinand  Indiana (1924)
 St. Peter Cathedral, Belleville, Illinois
 St. George Church, New Baden, Illinois
 St. Joseph Church, Freeburg, Illinois

References

.

American ecclesiastical architects
Architects of Roman Catholic churches
Architects from Missouri
German emigrants to the United States